The Township of Russell is a municipal township, located south-east of Canada's capital of Ottawa in eastern Ontario, in the United Counties of Prescott and Russell, on the Castor River.

The township had a population of 16,520 in the 2016 Canadian Census.

Communities
The primary communities are Embrun and Russell. The township administrative offices are located in Embrun.

Smaller communities listed in the official Ontario place names database are Felton, Forget, Marionville, North Russell and Pana. Both the municipal government and Canada Post consider Brisson and Forget to be part of Embrun, and Felton, North Russell, and Pana as part of Russell. Canada Post also considers Marionville to be part of Russell, although the municipality considers Marionville to be separate. As Marionville is on the border of the township, parts of it fall into the neighbouring jurisdictions of North Dundas Township and the City of Ottawa.

History
The Township of Russell, Ontario was named in honour of Peter Russell who came to Canada with John Graves Simcoe, the first Lieutenant Governor of Upper Canada. Russell was a general accountant of the public funds of the new province. He was elected a member of the executive and legislative council in 1792 and when Simcoe returned to England in 1796, he appointed Russell as administrator of the existing government, a position he held until Simcoe's successor arrived in Canada in 1799. Russell remained in Canada, dying in York (Toronto) in 1808. At one time the township was named Elmsley, it was officially named Russell in 1797.

 1791: The Parliament of Upper Canada (Ontario) divided the territory into four districts.
 1792: The four districts were divided into 19 counties. The territory that is now known as the Township of Russell, was in Stormont County.
 January 1, 1800: the subdivision of Stormont County created the County of Russell, which included the Townships of Clarence, Cambridge, Cumberland, Gloucester, Osgoode and Russell.
 1838: the Townships of Gloucester and Osgoode are annexed to the Carleton County.
 1841: a municipal law inaugurated the councils of the districts composed of representatives from the townships.
 January 1, 1850: under the Municipal Corporation Act (also known as the Baldwin Act) adopted in 1849, the districts councils were abolished and replaced by the township councils which become the only recognized administrative units. Thus townships and municipalities are born that they delegated representatives to the Counties Councils. When the number of male owners was less than 100, a township must unite to another to send a representative to the Counties. This is the case of the four townships in Russell County (Cambridge, Clarence, Cumberland and Russell) before December 28, 1850. With the increase in population, each township eventually delegated its own representative. Thus we witness the creation of the municipalities of Cumberland in 1850, Clarence and Cambridge in 1854 and Russell January 1, 1857.
2022: the town announces that, due to Peter Russell having been a practitioner of slavery, the town would no longer be named for him, and would instead be named for "all people named Russell who have had a positive impact".

The Great Fire in Russell
On June 6, 1915, fire started in Murray's Tinsmith Shop and quickly spread from building to building in Russell. Many residents tried to put out the fire with buckets of water, but it was evident they needed more help. Calls were made to the Ottawa Fire Department who came running faster than ever on the New York Central Railroad. They say it was the fastest a train ever went on that track. A total of twenty-five buildings were destroyed. The old land registry building lost its roof in the fire but all the records were saved. The oldest records of the building go back to 1852. The building is still standing today.

The New York Central Railway
The New York Central Railway was an essential part of Russell's development. In 1884, the Township's council knew that they needed transportation if they wanted the community to grow. There were a few train stations in the surrounding towns like South Indian (today Limoges), Osgood and Morewood, but to get there they needed to pay extra fare to take a stage. In June 1897, the council passed a by-law to raise $10,000 to aid the Ontario Pacific Railway Company to build the railway. In exchange, the railway company had to have at least two passenger trains that would stop for all the passengers each way at all the stations including Russell. The Ontario Pacific Railway Company changed its name to The Ottawa and New York Railway Company in 1898 then the line was leased to the New York Central Railway Company. With the building of the station, Russell Village became the commercial centre for the Township and also for the eastern part of Osgoode and the northern part of Winchester. The hotels were filled with travellers and settlers, new shops were opening and loads of farm animals passed through the stockyards. It became a livestock sales centre. Around 1940 the passenger traffic began diminishing, people had their own cars. In 1954 the passenger train service to Russell was abandoned. On February 14, 1957, the last train ran on the New York Central System.

Demographics 

Languages
The township is predominantly English-speaking with a significant French-speaking minority. 61% of the population speaks English most often at home, while 36% speaks French most often at home. The remaining 3% speak either both languages equally, or speak a non-official language most often. The different parts of the township have different distributions of language, however. Embrun has a slight francophone majority, with 50% French-speaking and 46% English-speaking. Russell, on the other hand, has a stronger anglophone majority, with 86% English-speaking and 12% French-speaking.

In terms of mother tongue, however, the statistics differ. Because it is more common for Francophone Canadians to switch to using English as their main language later in life, than it is for Anglophone Canadians to switch to French, the percentage of the population that has French as a mother tongue is higher than the percentage of the population that uses French as their main language at home. With the mother tongue statistic, the township is 52% anglophone and 43% francophone. In Embrun, 58% have French mother tongue and 38% have English mother tongue. In Russell, 75% have English mother tongue and 19% have French mother tongue.

The most commonly spoken minority languages in the township are Dutch, German, Spanish, and Italian. 280 people across the township have one of these four languages as their mother tongue.

Ethnocultural ancestries
The township's population is 93.1% white, 3.1% Aboriginal, 1.2% Black, 0.8% Arab, and 1.7% other visible minority.

The main ethnic ancestries among the white population are French, English, Irish, Scottish, German, and Dutch.

In data:

Single responses: 27.2% of respondents gave a single response of Canadian, while a further 23.6% identified with both Canadian, and one or more other ancestries. 9.7% of respondents gave a single response of French, 3.5% gave a single response of English, 3.1% gave a single response of Dutch, and 2.5% gave a single response of Irish.

Multiple responses: Counting both single and multiple responses, the most commonly identified ethnocultural ancestries were:

 ''Percentages are calculated as a proportion of the total number of respondents and may total more than 100% due to dual responses. All ethnocultural ancestries of more than 2% are listed in the table above according to the exact terminology used by Statistics Canada.

Organisations

The Russell Agricultural Society
The Russell Agricultural Society remains a vital community resource. According to the legislatures journals, the Agricultural Society for the County of Russell began as an offshoot of the Agricultural Society for the District of Ottawa in 1845. Funds were set aside to judge crops. Records are scant till the first Russell Fair was chartered in 1858.  The organization's mandate to promote agricultural heritage and the rural lifestyle is still strongly supported today (2014) with the Russell Fair traditionally held each year in September, on the first weekend after Labour Day. The community grounds are also used to celebrate other events such as Canada Day.

The Russell and District Horticultural Society
The Russell and District Horticultural Society brought neighbors together then and now. It began with the need for a community spring clean up in 1918. By January 1919 the Society was officially organized to encourage the care of lawns and shrubs and the growing of flowers and trees. Today the group has become dedicated to horticultural education and protection of the natural environment, as it continues to encourage the beautification of the community.

The Russell Lions Club
The Russell Lions Club grew from a need to fund the non-governmental needs of society. In 1947 the Ottawa Central Lions Club presented a charter to form a Lions Club in Russell. The first activity of the club was to sponsor the Russell Students Band, which then became the Russell Lions Band. The club has continued to grow, holding community dances and fundraisers to provide assistance for the less fortunate in the community. Thanks to the support of the community, the Lions Club of Russell continues today (2014) to contribute effective community service.

The Russell Historical Society and the Keith M. Boyd Museum
The Russell Historical Society and the Keith M. Boyd Museum preserve rural heritage. With the museum bearing his name, Mr. Boyd was an avid collector of historical artifacts and enjoyed sharing his knowledge with area residents through his articles in the Russell Villager. Donations from others wishing to preserve local history caused his collection to expand, requiring a home of its own.  The old Baptist Church became the museum and was officially named after Mr. Boyd and opened in 1989.  The Russell Historical Society maintains the buildings and the collections they house.

The Kin Club of Russell
Chartered October 1, 2011, the Kin Club of Russell is part of Kin Canada. The club has been very active in a relatively short period of time and has completed the following projects; Russell Winter Carnival, Poutmasters (a local fishing derby for mudpout), Reality Tour (drug awareness program for high schools), RocKIN' Away With Diamonds (a '50s and '60s dance), Marchons Pour Jonathan Pitre Butterfly Mile, Catch the Ace lottery and Trivia Nights. Its biggest contribution so far has been consulting and fundraising for the new Russell Township 4.8 million dollar Sports Dome, opened January 8, 2018. The Club meets once a month and consists of both men and women.

Climate

Politics

Township Council
The current council of Russell Township was elected on October 24, 2022 in the 2022 Ontario municipal elections.

 Mayor: Pierre Leroux
 Councillors: 
 Lisa Deacon
 Mark Lalonde
 Jamie Laurin
 Mike Tarnowsksi
Source:

The municipal offices are located at 717 Notre-Dame St. in Embrun.

Federal and provincial representation

The township is located within the federal electoral district of Glengarry—Prescott—Russell. It is represented by Francis Drouin (Liberal). The provincial electoral district, also named Glengarry—Prescott—Russell, is represented by Amanda Simard (Independent).

List of former reeves and mayors

Notable people 
 Khem Birch, professional basketball player for the Toronto Raptors of the National Basketball Association.
 Jean-Serge Brisson, former leader of the Libertarian Party of Canada and former councillor municipal of Russell.
 Jonathan Pitre

See also
 Russell Transpo - local public transit service
 List of townships in Ontario
 List of francophone communities in Ontario

References

External links

 
Lower-tier municipalities in Ontario
National Capital Region (Canada)
Township municipalities in Ontario